Froggattina is a genus of short-horned grasshoppers in the family Acrididae. There is one described species in Froggattina, F. australis. It is found in Australia.

References

External links

 

Acrididae